John Francis Bongiovi Jr. (born March 2, 1962), known professionally as Jon Bon Jovi, is an American singer, songwriter, guitarist, and actor. He is best known as the founder and frontman of the rock band Bon Jovi, which was formed in 1983. He has released 15 studio albums with his band as well as two solo albums.

In the 1990s, Bon Jovi started an acting career, starring in the films Moonlight and Valentino and U-571 and appearing on television in Sex and the City, Ally McBeal, and The West Wing.

As a songwriter, Bon Jovi was inducted into the Songwriters Hall of Fame in 2009. In 2012, he ranked number 50 on the list of Billboard magazine's "Power 100", a ranking of "The Most Powerful and Influential People in the Music Business". In 1996, People magazine named him one of the "50 Most Beautiful People in the World". In 2000, People awarded him the title "Sexiest Rock Star".

Bon Jovi was a founder and former majority owner of the Arena Football League team, the Philadelphia Soul. He is the founder of The Jon Bon Jovi Soul Foundation, founded in 2006.

Early life
John Francis Bongiovi Jr. was born in Perth Amboy, New Jersey, a son of two former Marines, barber John Francis Bongiovi Sr. and Playboy Bunny turned florist Carol (Sharkey). He has two brothers, Anthony and Matthew. His father was of Italian (the name Bongiovi comes from Sciacca, Sicily) and Slovak ancestry and his mother is of German and Russian descent. He has stated that he is a blood relative of singer Frank Sinatra. However, in a 2016 interview, he proved that this was false and that he is not a blood relative to Frank Sinatra. Bon Jovi was raised Catholic. He spent summers in Erie, Pennsylvania, with his grandparents, and sold newspapers. As a child, John attended St. Joseph High School in Metuchen, New Jersey, during his freshman and sophomore years. He later transferred to Sayreville War Memorial High School in Parlin, New Jersey.

Musical career

Beginnings
Jon Bon Jovi began playing music in 1975, at the age of 13, playing piano and guitar with his first band, Raze. At 16, he met David Bryan and formed a band called Atlantic City Expressway. Still in his teens, Bon Jovi played in the band John Bongiovi and the Wild Ones, performing in clubs such as the Fast Lane and opening for local acts. By 1980, he had formed another band, the Rest, and opened up for New Jersey acts such as Southside Johnny and the Asbury Jukes.

When he was 17, Bon Jovi was sweeping floors at his cousin Tony Bongiovi's recording studio, Power Station. In 1980, when Meco was there recording Christmas in the Stars: The Star Wars Christmas Album, Tony Bongiovi recommended John for the song "R2-D2 We Wish You a Merry Christmas", which became his first professional recording (credited as John Bongiovi).

In 1983, Bon Jovi visited a local radio station WAPP 103.5FM "The Apple" in Lake Success, New York, to write and sing the jingles for the station. He spoke with DJ Chip Hobart and to the promotion director, John Lassman, who suggested Jon let WAPP include the song "Runaway" on the station's compilation album of local homegrown talent. Jon was reluctant, but eventually gave them the song, which he had rerecorded in 1982 (following a rough early recording in 1981) with local studio musicians whom he designated The All Star Review: Guitarist Tim Pierce, keyboardist Roy Bittan, drummer Frankie LaRocka, and bassist Hugh McDonald.

Bon Jovi

In March 1983, Jon Bon Jovi called David Bryan, who in turn called bassist Alec John Such and an experienced drummer named Tico Torres. Guitarist Richie Sambora later joined the band; Bon Jovi, Sambora, Such, Bryan, and Torres became the founding members of Bon Jovi.

In 1984 and 1985, Bon Jovi released their first two albums and their debut single "Runaway" managed to crack the Top 40. In 1986, the band achieved widespread success and global recognition with their third album, Slippery When Wet, which had sold 28 million copies worldwide as of 2011. Slippery When Wet included three Top 10 singles, two of which reached number one: "You Give Love a Bad Name" and "Livin' on a Prayer".

As of 2019, Bon Jovi has released 14 studio albums, five compilations and three live albums. They have sold more than 100 million records worldwide, making them one of the bestselling American rock bands. Bon Jovi has performed more than 2,700 concerts in over 50 countries for more than 34 million fans. Bon Jovi was inducted into the UK Music Hall of Fame in 2006, and into the U.S. Rock and Roll Hall of Fame in 2018.

Solo career

In 1990, Jon Bon Jovi recorded a soundtrack to the movie Young Guns II more commonly known as Blaze of Glory. Having been originally approached by his friend Emilio Estevez to lend "Wanted Dead or Alive" as the theme song for his upcoming Billy the Kid sequel, Bon Jovi ended up composing an all-new theme song for the film's soundtrack and delivering his first solo album. The album featured guests such as Elton John, Little Richard and Jeff Beck. The title track, "Blaze of Glory", peaked at number one on the Billboard Hot 100. In 1991, "Blaze of Glory" won an award for Favorite Pop/Rock Single at the American Music Awards and awarded a Golden Globe, as well. The song also earned him an Academy Award nomination and a Grammy Award nomination.

In 1991, Jon Bon Jovi started his own label, Jambco Records, and produced Aldo Nova's album Blood on the Bricks, and Billy Falcon's album Pretty Blue World.

Bon Jovi's second solo album was 1997's Destination Anywhere. A short movie of the same name was recorded right around the record's release, based entirely on the songs from the record and starring Jon Bon Jovi, Demi Moore, Kevin Bacon and Whoopi Goldberg. The film debuted in 1997 on both MTV and VH1.

In 2012, Bon Jovi recorded a soundtrack to the movie Stand Up Guys more commonly known as Not Running Anymore. On December 13, 2012, it was announced that "Not Running Anymore" would be nominated for a Golden Globe Award.

In 2020, Bon Jovi released a Christmas single called A Jon Bon Jovi Christmas, with three new holiday songs.

Other ventures

Acting career
Bon Jovi is a credited actor in the films Moonlight and Valentino, The Leading Man, Destination Anywhere, Homegrown, Little City, No Looking Back, Row Your Boat, Vampires Los Muertos, U-571, Cry Wolf, National Lampoon's Pucked, and New Year's Eve. He also had a supporting role in the movie Pay It Forward, where he played Helen Hunt's abusive ex-husband. His TV series appearances include Sex and the City, 30 Rock, Las Vegas, The West Wing, and an extended stint on Ally McBeal as a plumber who was Ally's boyfriend for a short period of time. He also had a brief, uncredited role in the 1990 film Young Guns II. On January 24, 2011, it was confirmed that Bon Jovi would be cast in the film New Year's Eve, released later that year, as a successful rock star who is connected with Katherine Heigl's character.

Sports franchises
In 2004, Bon Jovi became founder and primary owner of the Philadelphia Soul of the Arena Football League. He appeared in several television commercials for the league, typically with John Elway, Hall of Fame quarterback for the Denver Broncos (and co-owner of the AFL's Colorado Crush). Bon Jovi is no longer part owner of the Soul. In 2011, Bon Jovi expressed interest in purchasing 15% of the Atlanta Falcons for $150 million.

In 2014, a group of investors including Bon Jovi made it to the final round of bidding to acquire the Buffalo Bills of the National Football League, but the team was sold to Terry Pegula, the owner of the Buffalo Sabres of the National Hockey League.

Philanthropy

During an appearance on The Oprah Winfrey Show in 2005, Bon Jovi (the band, not the individual) donated $1 million to the Angel Network foundation.

In July 2007, Jon Bon Jovi announced a project that would rehabilitate a block of 15 homes in north Philadelphia.

The Jon Bon Jovi Soul Foundation (formerly the Philadelphia Soul Charitable Foundation) was founded in 2006. It supports community efforts to break the cycle of poverty and homelessness. On October 19, 2011, it opened the JBJ Soul Kitchen, a community restaurant in Red Bank, New Jersey, where patrons pay what they can afford for their meals, either with money or by volunteering work. On January 21, 2019, the restaurant provided free meals to government workers and family members who had been affected by the federal government shutdown. Two additional locations have been opened in Toms River and on the Newark campus of Rutgers University.

Jon Bon Jovi is one of 21 artists singing on "Everybody Hurts", a charity single organized by Simon Cowell aiding victims of the 2010 Haiti earthquake.

Political activism
Although Bon Jovi's voter registration indicates that he is unaffiliated, he has supported and toured with many Democratic politicians. He toured extensively on behalf of presidential candidate John Kerry in 2004, appearing at and playing acoustic sets (with Richie Sambora) at rallies for the Kerry-Edwards ticket throughout the United States. He also played at a 2009 Manhattan fundraiser for former Secretary of State and 2016 Democratic nominee Hillary Clinton to lessen some of her $6.3 million 2008 campaign debt. On January 18, 2009, Bon Jovi performed a duet at the Obama Inauguration Concert of the Sam Cooke classic "A Change is Gonna Come" with Bettye LaVette. On June 4, 2009, Bon Jovi performed an acoustic benefit show for Democratic Governor Jon Corzine at the NJPAC in Newark, New Jersey.

On June 24, 2009, Bon Jovi, Sambora and Andy Madadian recorded a musical message of worldwide solidarity with the people of Iran. The handwritten Persian sign in the video translates to "we are one".

On December 15, 2010, Bon Jovi was appointed by Barack Obama to the White House Council for Community Solutions.

In 2017, Bon Jovi raised money for Jim Renacci, a Republican representative from Ohio's 16th congressional district and then a potential candidate for Ohio governor with whom he had had common business interests several years prior.

In the 2020 Democratic Party presidential primaries, Bon Jovi endorsed fellow New Jerseyan Cory Booker for President of the United States.

On October 24, 2020, Bon Jovi performed at a drive-in event for Joe Biden at Dallas High School in Dallas, PA.

On January 20, 2021, Jon Bon Jovi and the Kings of Suburbia performed a cover of the Beatles song "Here Comes the Sun" as part of the "Celebrating America" Inauguration of Joe Biden event.

Personal life

During a stop in Los Angeles on The New Jersey Syndicate Tour in 1989, Bon Jovi secretly took a trip to Las Vegas and married his high school sweetheart, Dorothea Hurley, on April 29 at the Graceland Wedding Chapel. The couple has four children: a daughter born in 1993, and three sons, born in 1995, 2002 and 2004.

A former resident of Rumson, New Jersey, Bon Jovi established his Sanctuary Sound recording studio in the basement of his home there.

He describes himself as a recovering Catholic.

Bon Jovi is a close friend of New England Patriots owner Robert Kraft and head coach Bill Belichick. He owns two Super Bowl rings from the Patriots and has performed several times at the Patriots' home field, Gillette Stadium.

On May 16, 2021, Bon Jovi received an honorary degree from Princeton University. He was recognized for his contributions in society areas, including music, history, education, literature, public service, public health, social justice and ending homelessness.

In October 2021, Jon Bon Jovi tested positive for COVID-19 and canceled his tour in Florida. He was reported as feeling "great" and being fully vaccinated. He had recovered from the disease by November 12, 2021. In April 2022, Bon Jovi spoke of how much his COVID-19 experience had impacted him, including in his songwriting, saying about COVID-19 that it made him realize "how volatile we are and how fragile life is. It didn't matter if you were young or old, American or Egyptian, no matter who you were or where you were from, the COVID-19 pandemic affected you. I was aware of that when I was writing the record."

Discography

Studio albums
 Blaze of Glory (1990)
 Destination Anywhere (1997)

Live albums
 At the Starland Ballroom Live (2009)

Compilation albums
 The Power Station Years: The Unreleased Recordings (2001)

Filmography

Films

Television

References

External links

Interview on CNN's Larry King Live, August 16, 2006

Jon Bon Jovi at Facebook

 
1962 births
Male actors from New Jersey
American male film actors
American rock songwriters
American tenors
American heavy metal singers
American heavy metal guitarists
American humanitarians
American people of Italian descent
American people of Slovak descent
American people of German descent
American people of Russian descent
Former Roman Catholics
Arena Football League executives
Southside Johnny & The Asbury Jukes members
Bon Jovi members
Brit Award winners
Glam metal musicians
Golden Globe Award-winning musicians
Grammy Award winners
MTV Europe Music Award winners
Island Records artists
Jersey Shore musicians
Living people
Mercury Records artists
New Jersey Democrats
New Jersey Hall of Fame inductees
People from Perth Amboy, New Jersey
People from Rumson, New Jersey
People from Sayreville, New Jersey
American male singer-songwriters
20th-century American male actors
20th-century American singers
21st-century American male actors
21st-century American singers
Singer-songwriters from New Jersey
Guitarists from New Jersey
American male guitarists
20th-century American guitarists
Sayreville War Memorial High School alumni
St. Joseph High School (Metuchen, New Jersey) alumni
21st-century American guitarists